The 1917 Mineola Aviation Station football team represented the United States Army aviators stationed at Mineola Aviation Station on Long Island during the 1917 college football season.

Raymond "Razor" Watkins, formerly of Colgate, played quarterback for Mineola and was selected by Walter Camp as the first-team quarterback on the 1917 All-Service football team.

Schedule

References

Mineola Aviation Station
College football undefeated seasons
Mineola Aviation Station football